Clobenzorex (Asenlix, Dinintel, Finedal, Rexigen) is a stimulant drug of the amphetamine chemical class used as an appetite suppressant. The drug is legally distributed in Mexico under the trade name Asenlix by Aventis.

Chemically, clobenzorex is an N-substituted amphetamine prodrug that is converted to d-amphetamine soon after ingestion. In commercial production, clobenzorex is supplied in 30 mg doses as the hydrochloride salt in green-tinted capsules. The drug gained use as a prescription anorectic in the 1970s.

In the United States, clobenzorex tablets (among other varieties of stimulants, such as amphetamine) have been used by athletes who ingest the drug to reduce fatigue, increase attention, and improve reaction times during athletic activities. The green-tinted Asenlix capsules (generic forms can be seen as half light green, half dark green capsules marked "IFA") are known as "greenies" among US baseball players, a slang term that in current use has expanded to generically refer to any amphetamine class stimulant.

Yet, Clobenzorex is not controlled within the United States or subject to import controls. Importation of Clobenzorex for personal use is lawful provided that is for use to treat a condition with no approved medications, unlawful marketing is not occurring in the U.S, not deemed hazardous to health for the treating the condition, and is verified as a continuation of a treatment plan that began in a foreign country.

Synthesis

Condensation between amphetamine (1) and 2-chlorobenzaldehyde (2) gives a Schiff-base, CID:135056236 (3). Subsequent reduction with sodium borohydride completed the synthesis of clobenzorex (4).

Apparently, also made from the acid chloride, and reduction of the amide with lithium aluminium anhydride.

Legal Status 
In Canada, Clobenzorex is not specifically listed in the CDSA, however due to structural similarities with norbenzphetamine, it is a schedule I under item 19(17). The substance is not scheduled in the United States and is unaffected by the Federal Analogue Act as a derivative of Benzphetamine.

See also 
 Benzphetamine
 MDBZ
 N-Benzyl-2C-B

References 

Anorectics
Substituted amphetamines
Prodrugs
Chloroarenes
Norepinephrine-dopamine releasing agents